Thunghong Subdistrict municipality Stadium is a multi-purpose stadium in Phrae Province, Thailand. It is currently used mostly for football matches and is the home stadium of Phrae United F.C. The stadium holds 3,000 people.

Football venues in Thailand
Multi-purpose stadiums in Thailand
Buildings and structures in Phrae province
Sport in Phrae province